"The Uninvited Guest" is the second single from English band Marillion's fifth studio album Seasons End, released in 1989. It was the band's first single since their debut "Market Square Heroes" in 1982 that did not enter the UK Singles Chart's top 40, peaking at no. 53.

Overview
Like most of the songs on Seasons End, the lyrics for "The Uninvited Guest" were written by John Helmer, who was appointed by EMI to write lyrics for the band following the departure of former lyricist Fish. In a 1994 interview with the Marillion fan club newsletter The Web, Helmer revealed the song was inspired by the AIDS epidemic, saying:

Track listing

7-inch and cassette version
Side 1
"The Uninvited Guest" (7-inch version) – 3:44
Side 2
"The Bell in the Sea" - 4:21

12-inch and CD version
Side 1
"The Uninvited Guest" (12-inch version) - 5:02
Side 2
"The Bell in the Sea" - 4:21
"The Uninvited Guest" (7-inch version) - 3:44
The CD pressing merely reverses the track order on side two.

Single version
"The Uninvited Guest" - 3:50

Music video
The video shows Hogarth as a man awakened during the night by The Uninvited Guest, also portrayed by Hogarth (often using split screen). The man is pursued around his living room by the guest, who appears and disappears at will while delivering the song's lyrics. The other band members observe proceedings from a table suspended in mid-air.

Chart positions

Personnel
Steve Hogarth - vocals
Steve Rothery - guitars
Mark Kelly - keyboards
Pete Trewavas - bass
Ian Mosley - drums

References

Marillion songs
1989 singles
1989 songs
EMI Records singles
Songs written by Steve Hogarth
Songs written by Steve Rothery
Songs written by Mark Kelly (keyboardist)
Songs written by Pete Trewavas
Songs written by Ian Mosley